Kamil Kašťák (born 8 May 1966 in Most, Czechoslovakia) is a Czech former ice hockey player.

Kašťák played in the Czech Extraliga for Dukla Jihlava, HC Litvínov, HC Sparta Prague and HC Plzeň.  He also played in the Swedish Elitserien for HV 71, the SM-liiga in Finland for Lukko and finished his career in Germany for the Lausitzer Füchse.

Kašťák played on the 1992 Czechoslovak Bronze Medal winning Olympic ice hockey team.

In April 2005 he became the coach of the Czech Second League team HC Most.

Career statistics

Regular season and playoffs

International

References

External links

1966 births
Living people
Czech ice hockey coaches
Czech ice hockey left wingers
Czechoslovak ice hockey left wingers
Ice hockey players at the 1992 Winter Olympics
Ice hockey players at the 1994 Winter Olympics
Olympic bronze medalists for Czechoslovakia
Olympic ice hockey players of Czechoslovakia
Olympic ice hockey players of the Czech Republic
Sportspeople from Most (city)
Olympic medalists in ice hockey
Medalists at the 1992 Winter Olympics
HC Dukla Jihlava players
HC Litvínov players
HC Sparta Praha players
Czech expatriate ice hockey players in Sweden
Czech expatriate ice hockey players in Finland
Czech expatriate ice hockey players in Germany